Pessimist - Live From Another Wasted Summer, listed as Pessimist (live) - EP on iTunes, is a live single from the band TAT. These are the only publicly known live recordings of the band (so far). A digital download is available on iTunes.

Track listing
"Pessimist" – 4:13
"Bloodstain" – 2:58
"Happiness" – 3:02

Personnel
Tatiana DeMaria – vocals, guitar
Tim Vanderkuil (as Time Vanderkill) - guitar, vocals
James Bailes (as Spreader) – bass
Robin Guy - drums (Tracks 1+2)
Dave Ruffy - drums (Track 3)

Information
All Tracks written by Tatiana DeMaria except:
 Bloodstain written by Tatiana DeMaria and Tim Vanderkill

TAT (band) albums
2006 EPs
Live EPs
2006 live albums